Terence Robinson (born 8 November 1929) is an English retired amateur footballer who played in the Football League for Brentford, Blackpool and Northampton Town as a centre half. At international level, he represented England Amateurs and was a member of the Great Britain squad at the 1956 Summer Olympics.

Club career 
Robinson began his career at First Division club Blackpool and later played for Loughborough College, leaving in 1954. Robinson joined Third Division South club Brentford in 1954 and made his debut in a 1–0 defeat to Norwich City on 23 October 1954. He failed to establish himself in the first team, with his best tally being 17 appearances during the 1955–56 season. Robinson departed the Bees in 1957, having made 38 appearances and scored one goal in three years at Griffin Park. Robinson saw out his short career with Third Division South club Northampton Town and Athenian League club Hendon.

International career 
Robinson won 10 caps for the England amateur football team. He was a member of the Great Britain squad at the 1956 Summer Olympics, but did not make an appearance in the tournament, and only played in pre and post-tournament friendly matches.

Personal life 
Robinson worked as a schoolmaster and held a position at Greenford Grammar School while playing for Brentford.

Career statistics

References

1929 births
Possibly living people
English footballers
Blackpool F.C. players
English Football League players
Brentford F.C. players
England amateur international footballers
Footballers at the 1956 Summer Olympics
Olympic footballers of Great Britain
Northampton Town F.C. players
Hendon F.C. players
Association football wing halves